Portanova may refer to:

People 
 Gennaro Portanova (1845–1908), Italian Catholic cardinal
 Germán Portanova (born 1973), Argentine football player and manager
 Daniele Portanova (born 1978), Italian football player
 Manolo Portanova (born 2000), Italian football player; son of Daniele Portanova

Places 
 Portanova (Casal Cermelli), a civil parish of the commune of Casal Cermelli in the  Province of Alessandria, Italy

Other 
 Portanova (Osijek), a shopping center in Osijek, Croatia
 Porta Nova (Volterra), a city gate of the commune of Volterra, in Tuscany, Italy

See also 
 Porta Nuova (disambiguation)